The second season of Fear the Walking Dead, an American horror-drama television series on AMC, premiered on April 10, 2016, and concluded on October 2, 2016, consisting of fifteen episodes. The series is a companion series and prequel to The Walking Dead, which is based on the comic book series of the same name by Robert Kirkman, Tony Moore, and Charlie Adlard. The executive producers are Kirkman, David Alpert, Greg Nicotero, Gale Anne Hurd, and Dave Erickson, with Erickson as showrunner for the second consecutive season.

The season follows a dysfunctional, blended family composed of Madison Clark (Kim Dickens), her fiancé Travis Manawa (Cliff Curtis), her daughter Alicia (Alycia Debnam-Carey), her drug-addicted son Nick (Frank Dillane) and Travis' son Chris (Lorenzo James Henrie). At the onset of the zombie apocalypse, their group includes Victor Strand (Colman Domingo), a smart and sophisticated conman-turned-businessman, Daniel Salazar (Rubén Blades) and his daughter Ofelia (Mercedes Mason). This season follows the group as they escape land for the sea, and their eventual journey to Mexico.

Production
On March 9, 2015, AMC announced it had ordered Fear the Walking Dead to series, with a two-season commitment.

Cast

Main cast

The second season features nine actors receiving main cast billing status, with seven returning from the first season; eight are listed as main cast members in the first season, while one new cast member is introduced. Colman Domingo was promoted from recurring status and Michelle Ang was added to the main cast as Alex, however she only appears in two episodes.
 Kim Dickens as Madison Clark: An intelligent and domineering high school guidance counselor, the mother of Nick and Alicia, and Travis' fiancée.
 Cliff Curtis as Travis Manawa: A resolute and peacekeeping high school teacher, Madison's fiancé, Chris' father, and Liza's ex-husband.
 Frank Dillane as Nick Clark: A brave and selfless recovering heroin addict, Madison's son, and Alicia's brother.
 Alycia Debnam-Carey as Alicia Clark: The fiery yet compassionate daughter of Madison, and the sister of Nick.
 Colman Domingo as Victor Strand: A smart and sophisticated conman-turned-businessman, who forms friendships with Nick and Madison.
 Mercedes Mason as Ofelia Salazar: The strong-willed and very capable daughter of Daniel and his wife Griselda.
 Lorenzo James Henrie as Chris Manawa: Travis and Liza's rebellious teenage son, who becomes more brutal due to the landscape of the deadly new world.
 Rubén Blades as Daniel Salazar: A courageous and practical former Sombra Negra member, a barber, Griselda's husband, and Ofelia's father.
 Michelle Ang as Alex: A pragmatic and quiet survivor introduced in Fear the Walking Dead: Flight 462 web series.

Supporting cast

International waters
 Arturo Del Puerto as Luis Flores: An ally and right-hand man of Victor Strand and Thomas Abigail. 
 Daniel Zovatto as Jack Kipling: A member of the pirates that develops an attraction to Alicia. 
 Jesse McCartney as Reed: Connor's brother and a hostile member of the pirates. 
 Mark Kelly as Connor: The antagonistic leader of a group of pirates and Reed's brother.
 Veronica Diaz as Vida: A pregnant woman and one of Connor's pirates.

Mexico
 Marlene Forte as Celia Flores: Luis' mother.
 Dougray Scott as Thomas Abigail: Strand's boyfriend and the namesake of the boat Abigail.
 Danay García as Luciana Galvez: A member of the La Colonia community in Tijuana, México, who helps Nick and believes that the walkers are not a bad thing.
 Paul Calderón as Alejandro Nuñez: A pharmacist and leader of La Colonia, a community in Tijuana, Mexico, he claims to have been bitten, but did not die/turn.
 Alejandro Edda as Marco Rodriguez: The leader of the gang who live near La Colonia.
 Karen Bethzabe as Elena Reyes: The Rosario Beach hotel manager who helps Alicia.
 Ramses Jimenez as Hector Reyes: Elena's nephew who used to manage the hotel with her.
 Andres Londono as Oscar Diaz: The leader of a group of survivors living at a hotel.
 Raul Casso as Andrés Diaz: Oscar's brother.
 Brenda Strong as Ilene Stowe: A member of the wedding party and mother in law of Oscar.
 Kelly Blatz as Brandon Luke: The leader of a group of young men that befriend Chris.
 Kenny Wormald as Derek: A member of Brandon's group.
 Israel Broussard as James McCallister: A member of Brandon's group.

Guest

California
 Patricia Reyes Spíndola as Griselda Salazar: Ofelia's mother, who emigrated from El Salvador with her husband Daniel to escape political unrest, appears as a hallucination.
 Elizabeth Rodriguez as Liza Ortiz: A no-nonsense and caring nursing student, Travis' ex-wife, and Chris' mother, died in the previous season but seen as a corpse in the premiere.
 David Warshofsky as George Geary: A weathered survivor intent on keeping his family safe on Catrina Island.
 Catherine Dent as Melissa Geary: The loyal and cautious wife of George and mother of their three children.
 Brendan Meyer as Jake Powell: An injured survivor who owes his life to Alex. Meyer had previously starred in Fear the Walking Dead: Flight 462.
 Dayton Callie as Jeremiah Otto: A mysterious man who owns a ranch near the border where he encounters an injured Ofelia.

Episodes

Reception

Critical response
The second season received mostly mixed reviews from critics. On Rotten Tomatoes, the season has a rating of 70%, based on 30 reviews, whose average rating is 6.60/10. The site's critical consensus reads, "Fear the Walking Dead sets sail in its sophomore season with an intriguing backdrop that doesn't always disguise its deficiencies in comparison to its predecessor." On Metacritic, the season has a score of 54 out of 100, based on 12 critics, indicating "mixed or average reviews".

Ratings

Home media
The second season, featuring audio commentaries, deleted scenes, actor interviews and various behind-the-scene featurettes, was released on Blu-ray and DVD on December 13, 2016.

References

External links 
 
 

2016 American television seasons
02
Works about Mexican drug cartels